The Crash Junior Championship is a professional wrestling championship contested for in the Mexican lucha libre promotion The Crash Lucha Libre based in Tijuana, Baja California. The junior championship is a secondary championship, behind both The Crash Heavyweight Championship and The Crash Cruiserweight Championship, primarily for lower ranked, younger wrestlers. As it was a professional wrestling championship, the championship was not won not by actual competition, but by a scripted ending to a match determined by the bookers and match makers. On occasion the promotion declares a championship vacant, which means there is no champion at that point in time. This can either be due to a storyline, or real life issues such as a champion suffering an injury being unable to defend the championship, or leaving the company.

The first junior champion was Star Dragón, which he became by winning a five-way elimination match over Black Boy, Destroyer, Enigma, Mirage and Mosco Negro. Toto is the current junior champion, having defeated Dinámico, Terror Azteca, Proximo, Kamika-C and Skalibur to win the championship at The Crash X Aniversario on November 5, 2021. This is his first reign as champion. Overall twelve wrestlers share eleven championship reigns, with only one wrestler, Black Boy, holding the championship twice. Astrolux's 64-day reign is the shortest in the championship's history, while Dinámico's 622-day reign is the longest reign so far.

Title history

Combined reigns

Footnotes

References

External links
 The Crash Junior Championship

Cruiserweight wrestling championships
The Crash Lucha Libre championships